Laban Rotich (born 20 January 1969 in Mosoriot) is a retired Kenyan runner who specialized in the 1500 metres. His personal best time is 3:29.91 minutes, achieved in August 1998 in Zürich. He holds the world's best indoor performance over one mile for men over 35 years with 3:53.18 minutes.

Achievements

External links

Pace Sports Management

1969 births
Living people
Kenyan male middle-distance runners
Athletes (track and field) at the 1996 Summer Olympics
Olympic athletes of Kenya
Athletes (track and field) at the 1998 Commonwealth Games
Commonwealth Games medallists in athletics
Commonwealth Games gold medallists for Kenya
Goodwill Games medalists in athletics
Competitors at the 2001 Goodwill Games
Medallists at the 1998 Commonwealth Games